Stefanie Pintoff is an American author of historical mystery novels.

Work
Stefanie Pintoff’s books take place in New York City in the early 1900s. Her character Simon Ziele is a police detective who lost his fiancée in a steamship accident, and Alistair Sinclair is a talented and egotistical criminologist.  Her work is known for intricate plots and historical details, with a focus on early criminal science.

Her book In the Shadow of Gotham won the Minotaur/Mystery Writers of America Award for "Best First Crime Novel", the 2010 Edgar Award for Best First Novel<ref>{{Cite web|title=Edgar Awards Database|url=http://theedgars.com/edgarsDB/index.php}}</ref> and a 2011 Washington Irving Book Award.

The 1904 General Slocum disaster played a prominent role in two of her novels: In the Shadow of Gotham and Secret of the White Rose.

Bibliography
 In the Shadow of Gotham, Minotaur Books, 2009
 A Curtain Falls, Minotaur Books, 2010
 Secret of the White Rose, Minotaur Books, 2011Hostage Taker, Ballantine Books, 2015City on Edge'', Bantam, 2016

References

External links

http://us.macmillan.com/author/stefaniepintoff

21st-century American novelists
American mystery writers
American women novelists
Living people
Year of birth missing (living people)
Writers of historical mysteries
Women mystery writers
21st-century American women writers
Women historical novelists